Juliana Stratton (née Wiggins; born September 8, 1965) is an American lawyer and politician, serving as the 48th lieutenant governor of Illinois since 2019. She previously served as a Democratic member of the Illinois House of Representatives from 2017 to 2019. She is the first African-American woman to become Illinois' lieutenant governor, and the state's fourth woman lieutenant governor overall, after Corinne Wood, Sheila Simon, and Evelyn Sanguinetti.

Early life and education
Stratton was born to a schoolteacher mother and doctor father, and raised in the South Side of Chicago, where she attended Kenwood Academy. Stratton earned a Bachelor of Science from the University of Illinois, Urbana-Champaign and a Juris Doctor from DePaul University.

Earlier career 
Juliana Stratton started her own consulting firm focused on alternative dispute resolution and served as a mediator, arbitrator and administrative law judge for several government agencies. Stratton previously served as the director for the Center for Public Safety and Justice at the University of Illinois at Chicago, Executive Director of the Cook County Justice Advisory Council, and as a Deputy Hearing Commissioner for the City of Chicago Department of Business Affairs & Consumer Protection, all with a focus on improving public safety and building stronger communities. She was also a founding board member of the Chicago's Children's Advocacy Center and served the Board of Directors of the Juvenile Protective Association.

Illinois House of Representatives 
In 2016, Stratton challenged Ken Dunkin for the fifth district seat in the Illinois House of Representatives. She received an endorsement from President Barack Obama, as well as support from several unions due to her support for "child care, labor, and home care".

In March 2016, she defeated Dunkin decisively, with 68% of the vote, in a primary race noted to be one of the most expensive in Illinois, with a total of $6 million in contributions for the candidates.

By August 2017, she had led 25 bills, with 9 appearing before Governor Bruce Rauner, and served on several committees.

Lieutenant Governor of Illinois 
On August 9, 2017, Stratton was announced as J. B. Pritzker's running mate in the 2018 gubernatorial election. She cited early childhood education and women's reproductive rights as two of her priorities, with criminal justice reform as another.

As of November 7, 2018, she was elected to the position of Lieutenant Governor of Illinois with her and Pritzker defeating Republican incumbents Bruce Rauner and Evelyn Sanguinetti. Accordingly, she resigned from the Illinois House of Representatives effective December 31, 2018. Lamont Robinson, the winner of the 2020 general election, was appointed by local Democratic leaders and sworn into office on January 2, 2019.

Since taking office, Stratton has spearheaded the Justice, Equity, and Opportunity Initiative and chairs the Illinois Council on Women and Girls, The Governor's Rural Affairs Council, the Military and Economic Development Council, and the Illinois River Coordinating Council.

In July 2021, Pritzker and Stratton announced that they would both be running for re-election in 2022. On November 8, 2022, Pritzker and Stratton won re-election in a landslide victory, defeating Republican challengers Darren Bailey and Stephanie Trussell. They began their second term on January 9, 2023.

Personal life 
Stratton is married and is the mother of four daughters and lives in Bronzeville. She cites her hobby of running marathons and triathlons as giving her the discipline needed for the rigors of campaigning. In Chicago, she is a member of the Chicago Bar Association and the city's chapter of Jack and Jill of America. Stratton was among the first customers to purchase cannabis when Illinois began recreational sale of the drug on January 1, 2020.

See also 
 List of minority governors and lieutenant governors in the United States

References

External links

 Government website

|-

|-

1965 births
African-American state legislators in Illinois
African-American people in Illinois politics
DePaul University College of Law alumni
Lieutenant Governors of Illinois
Living people
Democratic Party members of the Illinois House of Representatives
Politicians from Chicago
University of Illinois Urbana-Champaign alumni
Women state legislators in Illinois
21st-century American politicians
21st-century American women politicians
21st-century African-American women
21st-century African-American politicians
20th-century African-American people
20th-century African-American women